Edwin Hunter (March 25, 1874 – March 30, 1935) was an American golf and tennis player. He competed in the individual golf event and the men's doubles tennis tournament at the 1904 Summer Olympics.

References

1874 births
1935 deaths
American male golfers
American male tennis players
Olympic golfers of the United States
Olympic tennis players of the United States
Golfers at the 1904 Summer Olympics
Tennis players at the 1904 Summer Olympics
Sportspeople from Fond du Lac, Wisconsin